Feao Fotuaika (born 23 April 1993 in New Zealand) is an Australian rugby union player who plays for the Queensland Reds in Super Rugby. His playing position is prop. He has signed for the Reds squad in 2019.

Reference list

External links
Rugby.com.au profile
itsrugby.co.uk profile

1993 births
New Zealand sportspeople of Tongan descent
Australian rugby union players
Living people
Rugby union props
Queensland Country (NRC team) players
Brisbane City (rugby union) players
Queensland Reds players
Rugby union players from Gisborne, New Zealand
Tongan rugby union players
Tonga international rugby union players
Lyon OU players